Gertrude Helen Meredith (born May 28, 1892, in Yorkton, Northwest Territories, Canada; died February 24, 1986, in New York, New York) was an American pair skater who competed with Joseph Savage.  They won the bronze medal at the United States Figure Skating Championships in 1932 and 1933 and finished in last place out of seven pairs in the 1932 Winter Olympic Games.

Results
(pairs with Joseph Savage)

References

1892 births
1986 deaths
Sportspeople from Yorkton
American female pair skaters
Olympic figure skaters of the United States
Figure skaters at the 1932 Winter Olympics
20th-century American women
20th-century American people
Canadian emigrants to the United States